This is a list of people from Oakland, California, people born in Oakland or who lived in Oakland for a significant time.

Academics
Robert Harvey – comparative literature, philosophy
Nanos Valaoritis – comparative literature, poetry

Artists and designers

Natalia Anciso – artist and educator
Olive Ayhens – painter
Steven F. Arnold – filmmaker, photographer, painter, illustrator, set and costume designer, and assemblage artist
Garry Knox Bennett – woodworker, metalworker, furniture maker, artist
Bernice Bing – artist, activist
Warrington Colescott – artist and educator
Henry Doane – landscape painter, commercial artist
Janet Doub Erickson artist and author
Roger C. Field – industrial designer, graduated from California College of the Arts
Liz Hernández – painter, sculptor, graphic designer
Oliver Lee Jackson – painter, printmaker, sculptor
Walter J. Mathews – architect, designed the First Unitarian Church of Oakland
Bernard Maybeck – architect
Jeremy Mayer – sculptor
Julia Morgan – architect, raised and buried in Oakland
Willis O'Brien – animator
Nathan Oliveira – painter, printmaker, sculptor, professor
Lisa Quinn – artist, author, designer
Mel Ramos – painter
Favianna Rodriguez – painter, artist 
Galen Rowell – photographer
J. Otto Seibold – artist, illustrator, author
Elizabeth Sher – documentary and short filmmaker, artist 
Seasick Steve – blues musician
Betty Swords – cartoonist
Morrie Turner – artist, illustrator, author of the Wee Pals comic strip
Wendy Yoshimura – artist

Athletes

Zack Andrews – baseball player
Ron Allen (skateboarder) – professional skateboarder 
Pervis Atkins – NFL football player, Los Angeles Rams, Washington Redskins, Oakland Raiders, actor, The Longest Yard
Don Barksdale – basketball player
Drew Barry – basketball player 
Jon Barry – basketball player and sportscaster 
Charlie Beamon – baseball pitcher
Charlie Beamon Jr. – baseball player
Davion Berry (born 1991), basketball player in the Israeli Basketball Premier League
Davone Bess – football player 
Will Blackwell – football player 
Linc Blakely – Major League Baseball player, Cincinnati Reds
Marlin Briscoe – football player 
John Brodie – football player and sportscaster 
Jabari Brown – basketball player
Steve Brye baseball player, No. 1 pick of Twins, played nine years in majors
Don Budge – tennis player
Chris Burford – football player
Glenn Burke – baseball player
Steve Clark – swimmer, won five Olympic gold medals
Ray Crouse – football player 
Bruce Cunningham – Major League Baseball player, Boston Braves
Jared Cunningham - basketball player in the Israeli Basketball Premier League
Antonio Davis – basketball player 
Steve DeBerg – football player 
Bernie DeViveiros – Major League Baseball player, Chicago White Sox, Detroit Tigers
Taylor Douthit – Major League Baseball player, St. Louis Cardinals, Chicago Cubs, Cincinnati Reds
Forey Duckett – football player 
Dennis Eckersley – baseball player
Manny Fernandez – football player 
Eric Fernsten – basketball player, NBA, CBA, and Europe 
Curt Flood – Major League Baseball player, Cincinnati Reds, St. Louis Cardinals, Washington Senators known for challenging the Reserve clause
Greg Foster – basketball player 
La Vel Freeman – baseball player
Len Gabrielson – Major League Baseball player, Philadelphia Phillies
Len Gabrielson – Major League Baseball player, Milwaukee Braves, Chicago Cubs, San Francisco Giants, California Angels, Los Angeles Dodgers
Joe Gaines – Major League Baseball player, Cincinnati Reds, Baltimore Orioles, Houston Astros
Derrick Gardner – football player
Kiwi Gardner – basketball player
Brad Gilbert – tennis player and coach 
John Gillespie – Major League Baseball player, Cincinnati Reds
Jesse Gonder –baseball player
Drew Gooden – basketball player 
Alexis Gray-Lawson – basketball player, Phoenix Mercury
Bob Greenwood – Major League Baseball player, Philadelphia Phillies
Bud Hafey – Major League Baseball player, Chicago White Sox, Pittsburgh Pirates, Cincinnati Reds, Philadelphia Phillies
Tom Hafey – Major League Baseball player, New York Giants, St. Louis Browns
Roger Harding – football player 
Rickey Henderson – baseball player 
Jan Henne – swimmer, two-time gold medalist at 1968 Summer Olympics
Steve Hosey – baseball player 
Al Hrabosky  – baseball pitcher and sportscaster 
Proverb Jacobs – NFL football player, Philadelphia Eagles, New York Giants
Jackie Jensen – baseball player  
Brian Johnson – baseball player 
Josh Johnson –  Quarterback for the Cincinnati Bengals
Maurice Jones-Drew – football player 
Robert Jordan – football player
Bobby Kemp – football player 
Jason Kidd – basketball player and coach 
MacArthur Lane – football player
Cookie Lavagetto – baseball player and manager 
Tony Lema – golfer 
Bill Lester – NASCAR driver 
Damian Lillard – basketball player 
Ernie Lombardi – baseball player
Don Lofgran –  professional basketball player
Terrell Lowery – baseball player 
Lorenzo Lynch –  football player 
Marshawn Lynch – football player 
Eddie McGah – baseball player, part-owner of Oakland Raiders 
Bill McKalip – college All-American football player, NFL player, Portsmouth Spartans / Detroit Lions
Joe Mellana  – Major League Baseball player, Philadelphia Athletics
Demetrius "Hook" Mitchell – streetball player
Joe Morgan – baseball second baseman and sportscaster 
Kirk Morrison – football player 
Hank Norberg – football player
Mike Norris – baseball player 
Zoe Ann Olsen – olympic diver 
Gary Payton – basketball player, born and raised in Oakland 
Gary Pettis – baseball player and coach 
Paul Pierce – basketball player 
Vada Pinson – baseball player and coach 
Jim Pollard  – basketball player 
Damon Powell – basketball player
Leon Powe – basketball player 
Jarrod Pughsley – football player
John Ralston – football player and coach 
Isiah Rider – basketball player 
Chris Roberson – baseball player 
Frank Robinson – baseball player and manager 
Jimmy Rollins – baseball player 
Bill Russell – basketball player and coach 
Brian Shaw – basketball player and coach 
Paul Silas – basketball player and coach 
Fred Silva – football official 
Marvel Smith – football player 
Dave Stewart – baseball player and executive 
John Sutro – football player 
Ron Theobald – baseball player
Jim Tobin – baseball player 
Marviel Underwood – football player 
Kwame Vaughn (born 1990), basketball player for Maccabi Haifa in the Israeli Basketball National League
Langston Walker – football player 
Andre Ward – professional boxer 
George Wells – professional wrestler
Ray Wells – football player
Bill Werle – baseball player 
Archie Williams – runner
Dontrelle Willis – baseball player
Rodney Williams – American football player

Businesspeople, entrepreneurs and industrialists 
Stephen Bechtel – engineer, president, CEO of Bechtel Corporation, 1933-1960
Anthony Chabot – entrepreneur, father of hydraulic mining, namesake of Chabot Space & Science Center, Lake Chabot, and Chabot College, buried in Oakland
Charles Crocker – railroad tycoon, buried in Oakland
Debbi Fields – entrepreneur, founder of  Mrs. Fields cookies
Domingo Ghirardelli – founder of the Ghirardelli Chocolate Company based in San Francisco, buried in Oakland
Ken Hofmann – former owner of the Oakland Athletics
Henry J. Kaiser – entrepreneur, businessman, founder of Kaiser Permanente and Kaiser Family Foundation, buried in Oakland
Mark Mastrov – founder of 24 Hour Fitness, partial owner of the Sacramento Kings
 Jonah Peretti – founder of BuzzFeed
Francis Marion Smith (also known as "Borax" Smith) – miner, business magnate

Chefs 

 Tanya Holland –  chef, restaurateur, podcast host, and cookbook author.
 Nelson German – chef
Nite Yun - chef and restaurateur.

Entertainment

Mahershala Ali – Academy Award-winning actor
Eddie Anderson – actor
Max Baer Jr. – actor, film director
Matt Bettinelli-Olpin – filmmaker and musician
Pamela Blake – actress
True Boardman – silent film actor
David Carradine – actor
Rafael Casal – actor, writer
Connie Cezon – actress
Keyshia Cole – musician 
Tracie Collins – actress, writer, theatre director and producer
Ryan Coogler – director
Buster Crabbe – actor
T. D. Crittenden – silent film actor
Robert Culp – actor
Mark Curry – actor/comedian
Gloria Dea – actress, dancer and magician
Walter DeLeon – screenwriter
Daveed Diggs – actor and rapper
Rockmond Dunbar – actor, mixed-media artist
Michael Earl – puppeteer
Clint Eastwood – actor, Academy Award-winning film producer, and director
Lyndsy Fonseca – actress
Squire Fridell – actor
Cary Fukunaga – Emmy Award-winning director
Sylvia Gerrish – musical comedy and light opera
Sumner Getchell – actor
Gary Goldman – filmmaker
Michael A. Goorjian – actor and filmmaker
R. Henry Grey – silent film actor
Khamani Griffin – child actor
MC Hammer – rapper
Mark Hamill – actor
Bernie Hamilton – actor, Starsky and Hutch
Tom Hanks – Academy Award-winning actor, raised in Oakland
Susan Seaforth Hayes – actor
Claude Heater – opera singer and actor, Ben-Hur (1959 film)
Russell Hornsby – actor
Moshe Kasher – comedian, actor, and author/writer; raised in Oakland
Kehlani – singer
Joe Knowland – newspaper publisher, actor
David Labrava – actor, writer, tattoo artist
Remy Lacroix – adult actress
Ted Lange – actor
Brandon Lee (son of Bruce Lee) – actor, born in Oakland
Bruce Lee – actor, martial artist
Nnegest Likké – film director
Caryl Lincoln – actress
Delroy Lindo – actor
Dakin Matthews – actor
Russ Meyer – film director
Jefferson Moffitt – screenwriter, film director
Paul Mooney – comedian
Shemar Moore – actor, model
Mitch Mullany – actor
Kali Muscle – actor
Roger Nichols – recording engineer
Natalie Nunn – television personality
Laura Oakley – silent film actress
Orunamamu (Marybeth Washington-Stofle) – storyteller
Frank Oz – actor, director, puppeteer for Bert, Cookie Monster and Grover on Sesame Street
Chelsea Peretti – comedian, actress
Dorothy Revier – silent film actress, dancer
Cherie Roberts – adult model, photographer
Raphael Saadiq – singer, songwriter, multi-instrumentalist, and record producer
G-Eazy – rapper
Sheila E. – percussionist
Kellita Smith – actress and model
Jack Soo (Goro Suzuki) – comedian, actor, Barney Miller
George Stevens – Academy Award-winning film director
Cynthia Stevenson – actress, born in Oakland
Ethel Grey Terry – silent film actress
Colin Trevorrow – film director
Jo Van Fleet – actress
Matt Vasgersian – actor, sports broadcaster
Mills Watson – actor
Robert Webber – film and TV actor, 12 Angry Men
Will Wright – game designer
Daniel Wu – actor
Bassem Youssef – satirist
Zendaya – Emmy Award-winning actress
Angus Cloud – actor

Leaders (activists and politicians)
Richard Aoki – activist
William P. Baker – politician 
Sonny Barger – founder of the Hells Angels motorcycle club
Henry G. Blasdel – first governor of Nevada; resident of Oakland
Jerry Brown – politician, former governor of California and mayor of Oakland
Albert E. Carter – politician 
Frank Chu – eccentric street protester
William Clark Jr. – diplomat, ambassador
C. L. Dellums – organizer and leader of the Brotherhood of Sleeping Car Porters
Ron Dellums – politician, former U.S. Congressman and Representative, mayor of Oakland 
Frank M. Dixon, politician, former governor of Alabama 
Warren B. English – Confederate war veteran, politician, realtor 
Heather Fargo – politician, mayor of Sacramento, California
Lydia Flood Jackson, businesswoman, club woman, suffragist, an oldest living native of Oakland when she died in 1963
Marcus Foster – educator, the first African-American Superintendent of the Oakland Unified School District 
Alicia Garza – co-founder of Black Lives Matter 
Elihu Harris – politician, former mayor of Oakland
Juju Harris – food-affordability activist 
Kamala Harris – politician, U.S. Senator, first female African-American attorney general of California; first female, African-American, and Asian-American Vice President of the United States
Van Jones – founder, Ella Baker Center for Human Rights and Special Advisor for Green Jobs under US President Barack Obama
Fred Korematsu – Japanese-American who fought forced internment, testing the law in Korematsu v. United States 
Joseph R. Knowland – former U.S. Representative and former owner of the Oakland Tribune, cremated in Oakland 
William F. Knowland – former U.S. Senator 
Barbara Lee – U.S. Representative 
Charles Goodall Lee – dentist, civic leader, benefactor of the Chinese American Citizens Alliance
Clara Elizabeth Chan Lee – activist, first Chinese-American woman voter in the U.S.
Richard Lee – horticulturist, activist for the legalization of marijuana
Joseph McKenna – former Congressman, Justice 9th US Circuit, Attorney General and Associate Justice US Supreme Court.
Edwin Meese III – former U.S. Attorney General 
Victor H. Metcalf – politician, attorney, banker 
Jessica Mitford – writer, activist, former Communist 
Paul Montauk – Communist politician and two-time candidate for Oakland mayor
Anca Mosoiu – technology activist
Nancy Nadel – member of the Oakland City Council
Huey P. Newton – activist, co-founder of the Black Panther Party 
Andrew Nisbet Jr. – member of the Washington House of Representatives and United States Army officer
Pat Parker – black lesbian poet and activist 
Ed Rosenthal – horticulturist, publisher, activist for the legalization of marijuana
Byron Rumford – pharmacist
John A. Russo – Oakland city attorney, former city councilman 
Bobby Seale – activist, co-founder of the Black Panther Party
Hettie B. Tilghman – African-American activist and suffragist
Robert Treuhaft – activist for labor and leftist causes, attorney, writer 
Charles Stetson Wheeler – attorney, Regent of the University of California
Earl Warren – Assistant Attorney City of Oakland, District Attorney of Alameda County, Attorney General of California, Governor of California and U.S. Supreme Court Chief Justice
Lionel J. Wilson – politician, first African-American mayor of Oakland 
Mother Wright – anti-hunger activist

Military
Bud Anderson – USAF (served 1942-1972) fighter pilot and commander, triple ace who retired at the rank of colonel
Jeremiah C. Sullivan – Civil War general in the Union Army and staff member of Ulysses S. Grant, buried in Oakland

Musicians, composers and dancers

3XKrazy – male rap group
Thomas Lauderdale – musician and pianist
A-Plus – rapper
Tim Armstrong – musician, lead vocalist of punk rock band Rancid
Paul Baloff (d. 2002) – former lead singer of thrash metal band Exodus
Ant Banks – rapper, producer
Gaylord Birch – musician
Carla Bley – composer, musician
Boots Riley – rapper, filmmaker 
Mike Botts – studio musician, drummer for rock band Bread
Bobby Brackins – rapper, songwriter
Ian Brennan – Grammy Award-winning record producer and author
Antonia Brico (born Wilhelmina Wolthius) classical pianist, first woman conductor of New York Philharmonic
Chris Broderick – musician, lead guitarist for the heavy metal band Megadeth
Peter Buck – musician, guitarist and co-founder of the alternative rock band R.E.M.
Aaron Burckhard – musician, first drummer of the grunge band Nirvana
Kevin Cadogan – musician, original lead guitarist of Third Eye Blind
Emilio Castillo – musician, a founding member of Tower of Power
Casual – rapper
Mike Clark – musician
Cold Blood – rock, soul, jazz band
Keyshia Cole – Grammy Award-nominated R&B singer-songwriter, record producer, born and raised in Oakland
The Coup – hip hop group
Jason Cropper – original band member of Weezer
Del tha Funkee Homosapien – musician
Daveed Diggs – rapper and actor
Digital Underground – rap group
Sue Draheim – fiddler 
Mac Dre – rapper, born in Oakland, raised in Vallejo
Dru Down – rapper 
Isadora Duncan – dancer
Sheila E. – drummer, born in Oakland
E-A-Ski – rapper, record producer
En Vogue – Grammy Award-nominated female R&B singing group, originated from Oakland in 1990
Pete Escovedo – musician, born  in Oakland
Robb Flynn – musician best known as rhythm guitarist and vocalist for Machine Head
Michael Franti – musician
Fred Frith – improvisational musician, guitarist, composer, professor of music
Nils Frykdahl – musician, a founding member of Sleepytime Gorilla Museum and Idiot Flesh
David Garibaldi – musician, member of Tower of Power
G-Eazy – rapper and producer
Mic Gillette – musician, a founding member of Tower of Power
Goapele – soul and R&B singer
Larry Graham – musician
MC Hammer – musician, born in Oakland
Jeff Hanneman – former guitarist for heavy metal band Slayer
Shawn Harris – musician; former member of The Matches
Davey Havok – musician, lead singer for AFI
Edwin and Walter Hawkins – gospel singers
Hieroglyphics – rap group, originated from Oakland
Earl Hines – jazz pianist
John Lee Hooker – blues singer
Paul Jackson – musician
Henry Kaiser – musician, grandson of Henry J. Kaiser
Keak da Sneak – musician
Kehlani – singer
Kid 606 – musician
Sharon Knight – Celtic musician, founding member of pagan rock band Pandemonaeon
Kreayshawn – rapper
Stephen "Doc" Kupka – musician, founding member of Tower of Power
LaToya London – singer; born in San Francisco, raised in Oakland
Pep Love – rapper
The Lovemakers – pop band
The Luniz – Grammy Award-nominated rap duo
MC Lars – rapper; post-punk laptop rap
Michael Manring – bassist, born in D.C., lives in Oakland
Adrian Marcel – singer
Jim Martin – musician
Tony Martin – singer, actor
Dave Meniketti – rock musician; born and raised in Oakland; lead singer/lead guitarist for Y&T
Seagram Miller – rapper
Mistah F.A.B. – rapper
David Murray – musician
mxmtoon – singer/songwriter
Fantastic Negrito – musician
Noaccordion – multimedia project of Onah Indigo
Numskull – rapper
Ray Obiedo – musician
Marty Paich – pianist, composer, arranger, producer, director, conductor
Harry Partch – composer
The Phenomenauts – science and space band, refer to Oakland as "Earth's capital"
Phesto – rapper, producer
Matt Pike – guitarist of Sleep and High on Fire
The Pointer Sisters – Grammy Award-winning R&B singing group
Pooh-Man – rapper
PopLyfe – pop group
Francis Rocco Prestia – musician
Perri "Pebbles" Reid – singer-songwriter, manager of TLC
San Quinn – rapper, born in Oakland, raised in San Francisco
Richie Rich – rapper
Cynthia Robinson – musician
Raphael Saadiq – musician
Arion Salazar – musician in Third Eye Blind
Pharoah Sanders – musician
Timothy B. Schmit – rock musician, bassist for the Eagles
E.C. Scott – blues singer, songwriter and record producer; television host
Tupac Shakur – rapper, lived in Oakland
Shock G – rapper
Sharon Shore – ballet dancer, model
Calvin E. Simmons – symphony orchestra conductor, namesake of Calvin Simmons Theatre, born in San Francisco
Souls of Mischief – rap group
J. Stalin – rapper, co-founder of Livewire Records
Steady Mobb'n – rap duo 
 Jamie Stewart – frontman of the experimental group Xiu Xiu
Shakir Stewart – record producer, Senior Vice President of Island Def Jam Music Group
Freddie Stone – musician
Rose Stone – musician
Sly Stone – musician
Bill Summers – musician
The Team – rap group
Tony! Toni! Toné! – R&B singing group
Too Short – rapper, born in Los Angeles, lived in Oakland from 1980 to 1994
Tower of Power – band, formed and based in Oakland
Tune-Yards – band; indie, afro-funk
Weasel Walter – progressive rock and free jazz musician/composer
Freddie Washington – musician
Lenny Williams – musician, early member of Tower of Power
Y&T – rock band, formed in Oakland 1974
Yukmouth – rapper
Baba Zumbi – co-founder of hip hop group Zion I

Physicians
Eric Andrew Coleman – physician, practiced in Denver, recipient of MacArthur Foundation Fellowship ("Genius Grant") and Director of Care Transitions Program
Samuel Merritt – physician, practiced in San Francisco, namesake of Merritt College, Merritt Hospital, and Lake Merritt, buried in Oakland
Virginia Prentiss - nanny to Jack London, midwife and former slave

Religious leaders
Emma Pow Bauder – Conference Missionary of the United Brethren's California Conference
David A. Bednar – LDS Apostle, born in Oakland
David Berg – controversial cult leader, founder of Children of God
Yusuf Bey – controversial Black Muslim activist
Mose Durst – author, educator, former president of the Unification Church
James Ishmael Ford – Zen Buddhist priest and Unitarian Universalist minister
Ray Frank – female Jewish leader
Jack Hayford – minister, chancellor, songwriter
Judah Leon Magnes – prominent Reform rabbi, first President of the Hebrew University of Jerusalem
Carol Anne O'Marie – Roman Catholic nun, mystery fiction writer
Bebe Patten – evangelist and founder of Patten University
Clarence Richard Silva – Catholic bishop from Oakland, current bishop of Honolulu
Richard B. Stamps – anthropologist, archeologist, president of the Taipei Mission of the Church of Jesus Christ of Latter Day Saints
Allen Henry Vigneron – Catholic bishop, leader of the Roman Catholic Diocese of Oakland

Scientists and inventors
Harold C. Bradley – professor of biochemistry
Fernando J. Corbató – computer scientist
Frederick Cottrell – inventor
Kim Eric Drexler – engineer, molecular nanotechnology theorist
Frank Epperson – popsicle inventor
Alexei Filippenko – astrophysicist, professor of astronomy
Lloyd N. Ferguson – first African American to earn a Ph.D. in chemistry at the University of California, Berkeley
Ansel Franklin Hall – first park naturalist for Yosemite National Park, first Chief Forester for the National Park Service
Richard F. Johnston – ornithologist, academic and author
Ingemar Henry Lundquist – inventor and mechanical engineer
Stanley Miller – chemist
Sten Odenwald – NASA Astrophysicist
Wendell Phillips – archaeologist and oil magnate
Lydia Weld, first woman to get a degree in engineering from Massachusetts Institute of Technology and naval architect in World War II
William Shurtleff, researcher, technical writer, bibliographer, historian, and popularizer of soyfoods

Writers and poets

Daniel Alarcón – writer, currently resides in Oakland
Catherine Asaro – writer
Chauncey Bailey – journalist assassinated by an agent of Your Black Muslim Bakery
Delilah L. Beasley – first African-American columnist to be published in a major newspaper
Charles Borden – writer, sailed around the globe four times
Anthony Boucher – writer
Genea Brice – Poet laureate of Vallejo, California
Garrett Caples – poet, writer
Jon Carroll – columnist for the San Francisco Chronicle
Frank Chin – writer
Daniel Clowes – comic book writer, Academy Award-nominated screenwriter, currently resides in Oakland
Robert Duncan – poet
Sarah Webster Fabio – African-American writer, poet, educator; born in Nashville, lived in Oakland 1955-1979
Robert Harvey – literary theorist, born in Oakland
Bruce Henderson – author, born in Oakland
Sidney Howard – Pulitzer Prize-winning playwright, Academy Award-winning screenwriter
Daedalus Howell – writer, currently resides in Oakland
Maxine Hong Kingston – writer, currently resides in Oakland
Yiyun Li – writer, former creative writing instructor at Mills College
Jack London – writer, raised in Oakland, namesake of Jack London Square
Anthony Marra – writer
Rod McKuen – poet, composer, singer
Joaquin Miller – poet, lived in Oakland from 1886–1913
Jessica Mitford – author
Leila Mottley – author and poet
Jess Mowry – writer
Ray Nelson – science-fiction writer
Frank Norris – author, buried in Oakland
Colleen Patrick-Goudreau – author, speaker, and podcaster
Ishmael Reed – writer, currently resides in Oakland
Mary Roach – science writer, currently resides in Oakland
William Saroyan – dramatist, author, lived in Oakland from 1913-1918
Jason Shiga – author, cartoonist, puzzle designer
Emji Spero – writer, poet, performance artist
Jan Steckel – poet, writer, bisexual activist
Alex Steffen – writer, born in Oakland
Gertrude Stein – writer
Robert Louis Stevenson – writer
Tina Susman – journalist, Time senior editor, former national editor of BuzzFeed News 
Amy Tan – writer, born in Oakland
Ben Fong-Torres – rock journalist 
Jack Vance – science fiction writer
Nellie Wong – poet and activist, born in Oakland
Shawn Wong – writer, English professor
Helen Zia – writer, journalist, and activist, currently resides in Oakland

Criminals
Felix Mitchell – notorious drug lord and gang leader of the 1970s and early 1980s
Hans Reiser – computer programmer, owner of Namesys, convicted of murdering his wife
Tommy Lynn Sells – murderer and suspected serial killer

References

See also

List of people from San Francisco
 List of people from Palo Alto
 List of people from San Jose, California
 List of people from Santa Cruz, California
 List of people from Berkeley, California
 List of mayors of Oakland, California

 
Oakland
Oakland, California
People